The Life and Times of Grizzly Adams is a 1974 independent feature film produced by Charles E. Sellier Jr. and Raylan D. Jensen for Sun Classic Pictures. The film's popularity led to an  NBC television series of the same name. The title character, played by Dan Haggerty, was loosely based on California mountain man John "Grizzly" Adams (1812–1860).

Plot
The film portrays the somewhat fictional Grizzly Adams as a frontier woodsman who fled into the mountains in the year 1853, after he was accused of a murder he didn't commit. While struggling to survive, Adams saves an orphaned grizzly bear cub he adopts and names Ben. The bear, while growing to its huge adult size, becomes Adams' closest companion. Consistently kind and gentle, Adams discovers and demonstrates an uncanny ability to gain the trust of most of the indigenous wildlife of the region, and he helps, sometimes rescues, takes in and tames many species. Originally a hunter, with his learned affection for wildlife Adams resolves never to harm another animal whenever possible.

Adams also gains two human friends, an old mountain man trader named "Mad Jack" (Denver Pyle) who is often featured with his mule ("Number Seven"), and a Native American by the name of "Nakoma" (Don Shanks). Adams, Mad Jack, and Nakoma help myriad mountain visitors while protecting wildlife at the same time.

NBC aired the series finale of the TV series on February 21, 1982, by way of a two-hour TV movie called The Capture of Grizzly Adams; it presents an ending diverging from the 1974 TV movie portrayal. A hateful rancher, whose partner Adams allegedly killed, uses Adams' daughter Peg, who was not seen or mentioned since the 1974 film, in a ploy to lure the fugitive mountain man back to civilization and kill him. In the end, Adams exposes the rancher for the murder for which he was himself accused, proving his innocence.

Cast

TV series
 Dan Haggerty as James Capen 'Grizzly' Adams
 Denver Pyle as Mad Jack
 Don Shanks as Nakoma
 John Bishop as Robbie Cartman
 Bozo (a grizzly bear) as Ben (named after Benjamin Franklin)

In addition to Ben, there were many other named animals in the TV series, the most prominent being Number 7, Mad Jack's ornery mule. Bart the Bear, then a bear cub, made one of his first acting appearances in the series playing Ben as a cub.

1974 film
Lisa Jones as Young Peg
Marjorie Harper as Adult Peg
William Woodson as Narrator

The Capture of Grizzly Adams
Sydney Penny as Peg Adams
Kim Darby as Kate Bradey
Chuck Connors as Frank Briggs
G. W. Bailey as Tom Quigley
Noah Beery Jr. as Sheriff Hawkins
June Lockhart as Mrs. Hawkins
Spencer Alston as Daniel Quigley
Peg Stewart as Widow Thompkins
Ken Kemp as Ezra Thompkins

Production
The Life and Times of Grizzly Adams TV series was created by Charles E. Sellier Jr. and produced through Schick Sunn Classic Pictures, a company based in Park City, Utah and operated by its founding executives, Patrick Frawley, Charles E. Sellier Jr., and Rayland Jenson. Parts of the series were shot in the Uinta National Forest, Wasatch National Forest, and Park City. The low-budget independent studio successfully introduced innovative marketing and promotional methods. Its 1974 Grizzly Adams movie was a runaway success. Produced on a small $140,000 budget, the film grossed over $45 million at the domestic box office and $65 million worldwide. It was the 7th highest-grossing film of 1974. The 43% market share captured by a 1976 airing of the film on NBC led to network executives green-lighting the television series. The series drew a 32% market share, a significant figure to this day. The series also aired at a time when the environmental movement was beginning to flourish.

Bozo was purchased from a Kansas zoo, and trained by R.E. (Bob) Leonard.

The show's theme song, “Maybe,” was written and sung by Thom Pace. The song was released as a single in Europe, where it reached number one, and in 1980 won Germany's Goldene Europa award for best song. At the beginning of each episode, part of the theme song is sung, while at the end, the entire theme song is sung. "Mad Jack" also introduces the circumstances of Grizzly Adams, referring to him as a "greenhorn", his friendship with Ben and all of the animals. After selling many products bearing the Grizzly Adams brand name, the brand was eventually trademarked by its creator, film producer, Charles E. Sellier, Jr. Following Sellier's death in early 2011, the brand rights were transferred to Grizzly Adams LLC.

Production for the series also took place in Utah, with location work in Arizona and Ruidoso, New Mexico, depending on weather conditions, due to the similarities in terrain. As with the film, animals were provided and trained by the Olympic Game Farm, housed at a second game farm built at Woodland. A scaled-down version of Grizzly Adams' cabin, used to make Dan Haggerty appear taller, is currently located at the Olympic Game Farm in Sequim, Washington.

Home media
Shout! Factory, under license from CBS Home Entertainment, released both seasons in two region-1, 4-DVD sets: season 1 on November 6, 2012, and Season 2 on February 19, 2013. The same eight discs were reissued as Grizzly Adams: The Complete Series on May 31, 2016.

The Season sets do not include the 1974 film The Life and Times of Grizzly Adams, which led to the series. The Season 2 set does include Once Upon a Starry Night, which aired just after the regular series ended in 1978, but not The Capture of Grizzly Adams, which aired in 1982.

On November 12, 2013, CBS Home Entertainment released The Capture of Grizzly Adams on DVD in Region 1.

Episodes

Season 1 (1977)

Season 2 (1977–78)

Sequels
Dan Haggerty also played Jeremiah, a modern-day version of Grizzly Adams, in the films Grizzly Mountain (1997) and Escape to Grizzly Mountain (2000).

See also
 Gentle Giant (1967)
 List of American films of 1974

References

External links
 
 
 
 GrizzlyAdams.net, a detailed site with behind the scenes photos and episode summaries.

1974 films
1974 drama films
Films about bears
Television series about bears
Grizzly bears in popular culture
Works about mountain men
Films directed by Richard Friedenberg
1974 directorial debut films
American biographical films
American television films
American independent films
Paramount Pictures films
NBC original programming
Television series by CBS Studios
1977 American television series debuts
1978 American television series endings
English-language television shows
Television shows filmed in Utah
Films shot in Utah
1970s American films
1970s Western (genre) television series